L'Hermitage-Lorge is a former commune in the Côtes-d'Armor department of Brittany in northwestern France. On 1 January 2016, it was merged into the new commune Plœuc-l'Hermitage.

Population

See also
Communes of the Côtes-d'Armor department

References

External links

Former communes of Côtes-d'Armor